Star Magic Presents is a weekly love anthology program that began airing on the ABS-CBN network in the Philippines from July 29, 2006 to May 10, 2008. The show features artists from Star Magic, the talent management agency of ABS-CBN.

In an interview, Star Magic Director Johnny Manahan explained that the show's main goal was "to provide a platform whereby the agency’s fresh, yet unknown talents can shine in tandem with its more established stars. Each week, a new face is paired with an established artist, the better to remind the older stars of their responsibility to help their younger brothers and sisters."

In the Philippines, this program airs on Saturday at 10 a.m-11 a.m. in Metro Manila. (Timeslot may vary in some areas) It is also broadcast worldwide on TFC: The Filipino Channel.

It currently re-airs on Cinema One Global starting November 6, 2011 weeknights.

Episode guide

Season 1

The first five episodes feature Star Magic's top 5 female artists, followed by another 5 episodes featuring the agency's top five male artists.  Another six episodes featured a selection of the agency's younger talents in single-episode stories.

The Queens of Star Magic

The first five episodes feature the top five female artists of Star Magic, namely Kristine Hermosa, Angelica Panganiban, Bea Alonzo, Rica Peralejo, and Claudine Barretto.

The Kings of Star Magic

The next set of five episodes featured the talent agency's top five male artists, namely: Piolo Pascual, Diether Ocampo, John Lloyd Cruz, Zanjoe Marudo, and Sam Milby.

The 10th episode, Tender Loving Care, featuring Sam Milby and Denise Laurel was re-aired on November 11, 2006.

The Princesses and Princes of Star Magic

The next set of episodes featured younger artists of the talent agency.

Season 2: Abt Ur Luv

For its second and third seasons, Star Magic Presents shifts to a youth-oriented drama format, assembling 19 of its teen talents for a season-long story entitled Abt Ur Luv, under the direction of Erick Salud.

The cast is topbilled by the loveteam of Shaina Magdayao and Rayver Cruz.

Other cast members include: Carla Humphries and Denise Laurel; New Star Magic talents Victor Basa, Angelo Patrimonio, and Enchong Dee; PBB Teens Aldred Gatchalian, Joaqui Mendoza, and Mikki Arceo; and Star Circle Batch 13 talents Aaron Agassi, Valeen Montenegro, Christopher Gutierrez, AJ Perez, Dino Imperial, Empress Schuck, Lauren Young, and Zia Marquez.

Season 3: Abt Ur Luv, Ur Lyf 2
For its third season, Abt Ur Luv continues with more cast including John Wayne Sace and Erich Gonzales and some other Star Magic batch 15 teens'''.

Season 4: Astigs

Is another teen-oriented show that will feature different stories every six weeks.  For its initial offering "Astigs in Haayskul Life" is a story about five losers who make their own club named Astig.

References

External links
 Official Star Magic Presents site on ABS-CBN
 Star Magic Presents on ABS-CBN Now

Philippine teen drama television series
2006 Philippine television series debuts
2008 Philippine television series endings
ABS-CBN original programming
Philippine anthology television series
Filipino-language television shows